The Washington Monument is a 555-foot tall obelisk on the National Mall in Washington, D.C.

Washington Monument may also refer to:
Washington Monument (Baltimore), Maryland
Washington Monument (Milwaukee), Wisconsin
Washington Monument (Philadelphia), Pennsylvania
Washington Monument (West Point), New York
Washington Monument (Richmond, Virginia)
Washington Monument (Washington County), Maryland
Washington monuments, a list of all types of memorials to George Washington